Christopher Keith Irvine (born November 9, 1970), better known by the ring name Chris Jericho, is an American-Canadian professional wrestler and singer. He is currently signed to All Elite Wrestling (AEW), where he is the leader of the  Jericho Appreciation Society stable. Noted for his over-the-top rock star persona, in-ring technical wrestling prowess, and his ability to reinvent his character throughout the course of his career, Jericho has been named by journalists and industry colleagues as one of the greatest professional wrestlers of all time.

During the 1990s, Jericho performed for American organizations Extreme Championship Wrestling (ECW) and World Championship Wrestling (WCW), as well as for promotions in countries such as Canada, Japan, and Mexico. At the end of 1999, he made his debut in the World Wrestling Federation (WWF). In 2001, he became the first Undisputed WWF Champion, and thus the final holder of the WCW World Heavyweight Championship (then referred to as the World Championship), having won and unified the WWF and World titles by defeating Stone Cold Steve Austin and The Rock on the same night. Jericho headlined multiple pay-per-view (PPV) events during his time with the WWF/WWE, including WrestleMania X8 and the inaugural TLC and the Elimination Chamber matches and the shows itself. He was inducted into the Wrestling Observer Newsletter Hall of Fame in 2010.

Within the WWF/WWE, Jericho is a six-time world champion, having won the Undisputed WWF Championship once, the WCW/World Championship twice and the World Heavyweight Championship three times. He has also held the WWE Intercontinental Championship a record nine times and was the ninth Triple Crown Champion, as well as the fourth Grand Slam Champion in history. In addition, he was the 2008 Superstar of the Year Slammy Award winner and (along with Big Show as Jeri-Show) won the 2009 Tag Team of the Year Slammy Award—making him the only winner of both Superstar and Tag Team of the Year.

After his departure from WWE in 2018, Jericho signed with New Japan Pro-Wrestling (NJPW), where he became a one-time IWGP Intercontinental Champion, and becoming the first man to have held both the WWE and IWGP Intercontinental Championships. Jericho joined and has been with AEW since its startup in January 2019 and became the inaugural holder of the AEW World Championship in August of that year. While in AEW, Jericho would also capture the ROH World Championship (the main title of AEW's sister promotion, Ring of Honor) at the 2022 Dynamite: Grand Slam event. All totalled, between ECW, WCW, WWE, NJPW, AEW, and ROH, Jericho has held 35 championships (including eight World Championships, and 10 Intercontinental Championships).

In 1999, Jericho became lead vocalist of heavy metal band Fozzy, who released their eponymous debut album the following year. The group's early work is composed largely of cover versions, although they have focused primarily on original material from their third album, All That Remains (2005), onward. Jericho has also appeared on numerous television shows over the years, including the 2011 season of Dancing With the Stars. He hosted the ABC game show Downfall, the 2011 edition of the Revolver Golden Gods Awards, and the UK's Metal Hammer Golden Gods Awards in 2012 and 2017.

Early life 
Christopher Keith Irvine was born in Manhasset, New York on November 9, 1970, the son of a Canadian couple. He is of Scottish descent from his father's side and Ukrainian descent from his mother's side. His father, ice hockey player Ted Irvine, had been playing for the New York Rangers at the time of Jericho's birth. When his father retired, the family moved back to Winnipeg, Manitoba, where Irvine grew up. He holds dual American and Canadian citizenships. Irvine's interest in professional wrestling began when he started watching the local American Wrestling Association (AWA) events that took place at the Winnipeg Arena with his family, and his desire to become a professional wrestler himself began when he saw footage of Owen Hart, then appearing with Stampede Wrestling, performing various high-flying moves. In addition, Irvine also cited Owen's older brother Bret, Ricky Steamboat and Shawn Michaels as inspirations for his becoming a professional wrestler. His first experience with a professional wrestling promotion was when he acted as part of the ring crew for the first tour of the newly opened Keystone Wrestling Alliance promotion, where he learned important pointers from independent wrestlers Catfish Charlie and Caveman Broda. He attended Red River College in Winnipeg, graduating in 1990 with a diploma in Creative Communications.

Professional wrestling career

Independent circuit (1990–1991) 
At the age of 19, he entered the Hart Brothers School of Wrestling, where he met Lance Storm on his first day. He was trained by Ed Langley and local Calgary wrestler Brad Young.

Two months after completing training, he was ready to start wrestling on independent shows, making his debut at the Moose Hall in Ponoka, Alberta, as "Cowboy" Chris Jericho, on October 2, 1990, in a ten-minute time limit draw against Storm. The pair then worked as a tag team, initially called Sudden Impact. According to a February 2019 interview with Rich Eisen on The Rich Eisen Show, Jericho stated that his initial name was going to be "Jack Action" however, someone remarked to him that the name was stupid, they then asked him what his name really was, he then got nervous and said "Chris Jericho". He took the name Jericho from an album, Walls of Jericho, by German power metal band, Helloween. Jericho and Storm worked for Tony Condello in the tours of Northern Manitoba with Adam Copeland (Edge), Jason Reso (Christian) and Terry Gerin (Rhino). The pair also wrestled in Calgary's Canadian National Wrestling Alliance (CNWA) and Canadian Rocky Mountain Wrestling (CRMW).

Frontier Martial-Arts Wrestling (1991) 
In 1991, Jericho and Storm started touring in Japan for Frontier Martial-Arts Wrestling as Sudden Impact, where he befriended Ricky Fuji, who also trained under Stu Hart.

Consejo Mundial de Lucha Libre and other Mexican promotions (1992–1995)
In the winter of 1992, he traveled to Mexico and competed under the name Leon D'Oro ("Golden Lion", a name that fans voted on for him between "He-Man", "Chris Power", and his preferred choice "Leon D'Oro"), and later Corazón de León ("Lion Heart"), where he wrestled for several small wrestling companies.

From 1993 to 1995, he competed in Mexico's oldest promotion, Consejo Mundial de Lucha Libre (CMLL). In CMLL, Jericho took on Silver King, Negro Casas, and Último Dragón en route to an eleven-month reign as the NWA Middleweight Champion that began in December 1993.

Smoky Mountain Wrestling (1994) 
1994 saw Jericho reunited with Storm, as The Thrillseekers in Jim Cornette's Appalachian Smoky Mountain Wrestling (SMW) promotion, where they feuded with the likes of Well Dunn, The Rock 'n' Roll Express, and The Heavenly Bodies.

Wrestling and Romance/WAR (1994–1996) 
In late 1994, Jericho began competing regularly in Japan for Genichiro Tenryu's Wrestling and Romance (later known as Wrestle Association "R") (WAR) promotion as The Lion Heart. In November 1994, Último Dragón defeated him for the NWA World Middleweight Championship, which he had won while wrestling in Mexico.

In March 1995, Jericho lost to Gedo in the final of a tournament to crown the inaugural WAR International Junior Heavyweight Champion. He defeated Gedo for the championship in June 1995, losing it to Último Dragón the next month. In December 1995, Jericho competed in the second Super J-Cup tournament, defeating Hanzo Nakajima in the first round, but losing to Wild Pegasus in the second round.

In 1995, Jericho joined the heel stable Fuyuki-Gun ("Fuyuki Army") with Hiromichi Fuyuki, Gedo, and Jado, adopting the name Lion Do. In February 1996, Jericho and Gedo won a tournament for the newly created International Junior Heavyweight Tag Team Championship, defeating Lance Storm and Yuji Yasuraoka in the final. They lost the championship to Storm and Yasuraoka the following month. Jericho made his final appearances with WAR in July 1996, having wrestled a total of twenty-four tours for the company.

Extreme Championship Wrestling (1996) 
In 1995, thanks in part to recommendations by Benoit, Dave Meltzer and Perry Saturn, to promoter Paul Heyman, and after Mick Foley saw Jericho's match against Último Dragón for the WAR International Junior Heavyweight Championship in July 1995 and gave a tape of the match to Heyman, Jericho began wrestling for the Philadelphia-based Extreme Championship Wrestling (ECW) promotion, winning the ECW World Television Championship from Pitbull #2 in June 1996 at Hardcore Heaven. While in ECW, Jericho wrestled Taz, Sabu, Rob Van Dam, Foley (as Cactus Jack), Shane Douglas, and 2 Cold Scorpio. He made his final appearance at The Doctor Is In in August 1996. It was during this time that he drew the attention of World Championship Wrestling (WCW).

World Championship Wrestling (1996–1999)

Early appearances (1996–1997) 
Jericho debuted for WCW on August 20, 1996, by defeating Mr. JL, which aired on the August 31 episode of Saturday Night. Jericho's televised debut in WCW occurred on the August 26 episode of Monday Nitro against Alex Wright in a match which ended in a no contest. He made his pay-per-view debut on September 15 against Chris Benoit in a losing effort at Fall Brawl. The following month, at Halloween Havoc, Jericho lost to nWo member Syxx due to biased officiating by nWo referee Nick Patrick. This led to a match between Jericho and Patrick at World War 3, which stipulated that Jericho's one arm would be tied behind his back. Despite the odds stacked against him, Jericho won the match. Later that night, Jericho participated in the namesake battle royal for a future WCW World Heavyweight Championship match but failed to win the match.

Jericho represented WCW against nWo Japan member Masahiro Chono in a losing effort at the nWo Souled Out event. At SuperBrawl VII, Jericho unsuccessfully challenged Eddie Guerrero for the United States Heavyweight Championship.

Cruiserweight Champion (1997–1998) 
On June 28, 1997, Jericho defeated Syxx at the Saturday Nitro live event in Los Angeles, California, to win the WCW Cruiserweight Championship for the first time, thus winning the first championship of his WCW career. Jericho successfully defended the title against Ultimo Dragon at Bash at the Beach, before losing the title to Alex Wright on the July 28 episode of Monday Nitro. Jericho unsuccessfully challenged Wright for the title at Road Wild, before defeating Wright in a rematch to win his second Cruiserweight Championship on the August 16 episode of Saturday Night. Jericho began feuding with Eddie Guerrero over the title as he successfully defended the title against Guerrero at Clash of the Champions XXXV before losing the title to Guerrero at Fall Brawl. Jericho defeated Gedo at Halloween Havoc. At World War 3, Jericho participated in the namesake battle royal but failed to win.

On the January 15, 1998, episode of Thunder, Jericho defeated Eddie Guerrero to earn a title shot against Rey Mysterio Jr. for the Cruiserweight Championship at Souled Out. Jericho won the match by forcing Mysterio to submit to the Liontamer. After the match, Jericho turned heel by assaulting Mysterio's knee with a toolbox. In the storyline, Mysterio needed six months of recovery before he could return to the ring. Jericho then had a short feud with Juventud Guerrera in which Guerrera repeatedly requested a shot at Jericho's Cruiserweight Championship, but Jericho constantly rebuffed him. The feud culminated in a title versus mask match at SuperBrawl VIII. Guerrera lost the match and was forced to remove his mask. Following this match, Jericho began his ongoing gimmick of collecting and wearing to the ring trophy items from his defeated opponents, such as Guerrera's mask, Prince Iaukea's Hawaiian dress, and a headband from Disco Inferno.

Jericho then began a long feud with Dean Malenko, in which Jericho repeatedly claimed he was a better wrestler than Malenko, but refused to wrestle him. Because of his mastery of technical wrestling, Malenko was known as "The Man of 1,000 Holds", so Jericho claimed to be "The Man of 1,004 Holds"; Jericho mentions in his autobiography that this line originated from an IWA interview he saw as a child, where manager Floyd Creatchman claimed that Leo Burke, the first professional wrestler to be known as "The Man of 1,000 Holds", was now known as "The Man of 1,002 Holds", to which Floyd Creatchman stated that "he learned two more".

During the March 30, 1998, episode of Nitro, after defeating Marty Jannetty, Jericho pulled out a long pile of paper that listed each of the 1,004 holds he knew and recited them to the audience. Many of the holds were fictional, and nearly every other hold was an armbar. On the March 12, 1998, episode of Thunder, Malenko defeated a wrestler wearing Juventud Guerrera's mask who appeared to be Jericho. However, the masked wrestler was actually Lenny Lane, whom Jericho bribed to appear in the match. This started a minor feud between Lane and Jericho after Jericho refused to pay Lane. At Uncensored, Jericho finally wrestled Malenko and defeated him, after which Malenko took a leave of absence from wrestling. Jericho then proceeded to bring with him to the ring a portrait of Malenko that he insulted and demeaned. Just prior to Slamboree, J. J. Dillon (referred to by Jericho as "Jo Jo") scheduled a cruiserweight Battle Royal, the winner of which would immediately have a shot at Jericho's Cruiserweight Championship. Jericho accepted on the grounds that whoever he faced would be too tired to win a second match. At Slamboree, Jericho came out to introduce the competitors in an insulting fashion before the match started and then went backstage for coffee. An individual who appeared to be Ciclope won the battle royal after Juventud Guerrera shook his hand and then eliminated himself. The winner was a returning Malenko in disguise. Following one of the loudest crowd reactions in WCW history, Malenko proceeded to defeat Jericho for the championship. Jericho claiming he was the victim of a carefully planned conspiracy to get the belt off of him. He at first blamed the WCW locker room, then added Dillon, Ted Turner, and finally in a vignette, he walked around Washington, D.C., with the sign "conspiracy victim" and accused President Bill Clinton of being one of the conspirators after being rejected from a meeting. Eventually, Malenko vacated the title. Jericho ended up defeating Malenko at The Great American Bash to win the vacant title after Malenko was disqualified after hitting Jericho with a chair. The next night, Malenko was suspended for his actions.

At Bash at the Beach, the recently returned Rey Mysterio Jr. (who had recovered from his knee injury) defeated Jericho in a No Disqualification match after the still-suspended Malenko interfered. Jericho regained the Cruiserweight Championship from Mysterio the next night after he interrupted J. J. Dillon while Dillon was giving the championship to Mysterio. Jericho was again awarded the championship. Eventually, Jericho decisively lost the title to Juventud Guerrera in a match at Road Wild with Malenko as special referee.

World Television Champion (1998–1999) 
On August 10, Jericho defeated Stevie Ray to win the World Television Championship (Stevie Ray substituting for the champion Booker T). Soon afterward, Jericho repeatedly called out WCW World Heavyweight Champion Goldberg in an attempt to begin a feud with him, but never actually wrestled him. Jericho cites Eric Bischoff, Goldberg and Hulk Hogan's refusal to book Jericho in a pay-per-view squash match loss against Goldberg, which Jericho felt would be a big draw, as a major reason for leaving the company.

On November 30, Jericho lost the World Television Championship to Konnan. In early 1999, Jericho began a feud with Perry Saturn. The feud saw Jericho and Saturn instigating bizarre stipulation matches, such as at Souled Out, where Jericho defeated Saturn in a "loser must wear a dress" match. At SuperBrawl IX, Jericho and Saturn wrestled in a "dress" match which Jericho won. Saturn finally defeated Jericho at Uncensored in a Dog Collar match. Jericho alternated between WCW and a number of Japanese tours before he signed a contract with the World Wrestling Federation (WWF) on June 30. Jericho's final WCW match came during a Peoria, Illinois, house show July 21, where he and Eddie Guerrero lost to Billy Kidman and Rey Mysterio Jr. in a tag team match.

Fifteen years after Jericho's departure from WCW, his best known entrance music within the company, "One Crazed Anarchist", lent its name to the second single from his band Fozzy's 2014 album, Do You Wanna Start a War.

New Japan Pro-Wrestling (1997–1998) 
In January 1997, Jericho made his debut for New Japan Pro-Wrestling (NJPW), who had a working agreement with WCW, as Super Liger, the masked nemesis of Jyushin Thunder Liger. According to Jericho, Super Liger's first match against Koji Kanemoto at Wrestling World 1997 was so poorly received that the gimmick was dropped instantly. Jericho botched several moves in the match and complained he had difficulty seeing through the mask. The following six months, Jericho worked for New Japan unmasked, before being called back by WCW. On September 23, 1998, Jericho made a one-night-only return to NJPW at that years Big Wednesday show, teaming with Black Tiger against IWGP Junior Heavyweight Tag Team Champions Shinjiro Otani and Tatsuhito Takaiwa in a title match, which Jericho and Tiger lost.

World Wrestling Federation/Entertainment (1999–2005)

Intercontinental Champion (1999–2001) 

In the weeks before Jericho's debut, a clock labeled "countdown to the new millennium" appeared on WWF programming. On the home video, Break Down the Walls, Jericho states he was inspired to do this as his entrance when he saw a similar clock in a post office and Vince McMahon approved its use as his introduction to the WWF. The clock finally ran out on the August 9 episode of Raw Is War in Chicago, Illinois while The Rock was in the ring cutting a promo on the Big Show. Jericho entered the arena and proclaimed "Raw Is Jericho" and that he had "come to save the World Wrestling Federation", referring to himself as "Y2J" (a play on the Y2K bug). The Rock proceeded to verbally mock him for his interruption. Later that month, he would interact with several superstars including in particular interrupting a promo that The Undertaker was involved in, Jericho made his in-ring debut as a heel on August 26, losing a match against Road Dogg by disqualification on the inaugural episode of SmackDown! after he performed a powerbomb on Road Dogg through a table.

Jericho's first long-term feud was with Chyna, for the WWF Intercontinental Championship. After losing to Chyna at Survivor Series, Jericho defeated her to win his first WWF Intercontinental Championship at Armageddon. This feud included a controversial decision during a rematch in which two separate referees declared each one of them the winner of a match for the title. As a result, they became co-champions, during which Jericho turned face. He attained sole champion status at the Royal Rumble.

Jericho lost the WWF Intercontinental title to then-European Champion Kurt Angle at No Way Out. Jericho competed in a Triple Threat match against Chris Benoit and Angle at WrestleMania 2000 in a two-falls contest with both of Angle's titles at stake. Jericho won the European Championship by pinning Benoit, who in turn pinned Jericho to win the WWF Intercontinental Championship. This was the first of six pay-per-view matches between the pair within twelve months. Jericho was originally supposed to be in the main event of WrestleMania, but was taken out after Mick Foley, who was originally asked by writers to be in the match, took his place. Jericho was even advertised on the event's posters promoting the match. Jericho lost the title the next day to Eddie Guerrero on Raw after Chyna sided with Guerrero.

On the April 17 episode of Raw, Jericho upset Triple H in a WWF Championship match. Referee Earl Hebner made a fast count when Jericho pinned Triple H, causing Jericho to win the title. Hebner later reversed the decision due to pressure from Triple H, and WWE does not recognize Jericho's reign as champion. On April 19, Jericho defeated Eddie Guerrero at the Gary Albright Memorial Show organized by World Xtreme Wrestling (WXW). On the May 4 episode of SmackDown!, Jericho defeated Benoit to win his third WWF Intercontinental Championship but lost the title to Benoit four days later on Raw. Jericho's feud with Triple H ended at Fully Loaded, when they competed in a Last Man Standing match. Jericho lost the match to Triple H only by one second, despite the repeated assistance Triple H's wife, Stephanie, provided him in the match.

At the 2001 Royal Rumble, Jericho defeated Chris Benoit in a ladder match to win the WWF Intercontinental Championship for the fourth time. At WrestleMania X-Seven, he successfully defended his title in a match against William Regal, only to lose it four days later to Triple H. At Judgment Day, Jericho and Benoit won a tag team turmoil match and earned a shot at Stone Cold Steve Austin and Triple H for their WWF Tag Team Championship on Raw the next night. Benoit and Jericho won the match, in which Triple H legitimately tore his quadriceps, spending the rest of the year injured. Benoit and Jericho each became a WWF Tag Team Champion for the first time. The team defended their title in the first fatal four-way Tables, Ladders and Chairs match, where Benoit sustained a year-long injury after missing a diving headbutt through a table. Despite Benoit being carried out on a stretcher, he returned to the match to climb the ladder and retain the championship. The two lost the title one month later to The Dudley Boyz on the June 21 episode of SmackDown!. At King of the Ring, both Benoit and Jericho competed in a triple threat match for Austin's WWF Championship, in which Booker T interfered as the catalyst for The Invasion angle. Despite Booker T's interference, Austin retained the title.

Undisputed WWF Champion (2001–2002) 
In the following months, Jericho became a major force in The Invasion storyline in which WCW and ECW joined forces to overtake the WWF. Jericho remained on the side of the WWF despite previously competing in WCW and ECW. However, Jericho began showing jealousy toward fellow WWF member The Rock. They faced each other in a match at No Mercy for the WCW Championship after Jericho defeated Rob Van Dam in a number one contenders match on the October 11 episode of SmackDown!. Jericho won the WCW Championship at No Mercy when he pinned The Rock after debuting a new finisher, the Breakdown, onto a steel chair, winning his first world title in the process. One night later, the two put their differences aside and won the WWF Tag Team Championship from the Dudley Boyz.

After they lost the titles to Test and Booker T on the November 1 episode of SmackDown!, they continued their feud. On the November 5 episode of Raw, The Rock defeated Jericho to regain the WCW Championship. Following the match, Jericho attacked The Rock with a steel chair. At Survivor Series, Jericho turned heel by almost costing Team WWF the victory after he was eliminated in their Winner Take All matchup by once again attacking The Rock. Despite this, Team WWF won the match. At Vengeance, Jericho defeated both The Rock for the World Championship (formerly the WCW Championship) and Stone Cold Steve Austin for his first WWF Championship on the same night to become the first wrestler to hold both championships at the same time, which made him the first-ever Undisputed WWF Champion, as well as the fourth Grand Slam winner under the original format. He retained the title at the Royal Rumble against The Rock and at No Way Out against Austin. Jericho later lost the title to Royal Rumble winner Triple H in the main event of WrestleMania X8. Jericho was later drafted to the SmackDown! brand in the inaugural WWF draft lottery. He would then appear at Backlash, interfering in Triple H's Undisputed WWF Championship match against Hollywood Hulk Hogan. He was quickly dumped out the ring, but Triple H would go on to lose the match. This would lead to a Hell in a Cell match at Judgment Day in May, where Triple H would emerge victorious. Jericho would then compete in the 2002 King of the Ring tournament, defeating Edge and The Big Valbowski to advance to the semi-finals, where he was defeated by Rob Van Dam at King of the Ring. In July, he began a feud with the debuting John Cena, losing to him at Vengeance.

Teaming and feuding with Christian (2002–2004) 

After his feud with Cena ended, Jericho moved to the Raw brand on the July 29 episode of Raw, unwilling to work for SmackDown! General Manager Stephanie McMahon. Upon his arrival to the brand, he initiated a feud with Ric Flair, leading to a match at SummerSlam, which Jericho lost. On the September 16 episode of Raw, he won the WWE Intercontinental Championship for the fifth time from Rob Van Dam, before losing the title to Kane two weeks later on Raw. He then later formed a tag team with Christian, with whom he won the World Tag Team Championship by defeating Kane and The Hurricane on the October 14 episode of Raw. Christian and Jericho lost the titles to Booker T and Goldust in a fatal four-way elimination match, involving the teams of The Dudley Boyz, and William Regal and Lance Storm at Armageddon.

On the January 13 episode of Raw, Jericho won an over-the-top-rope challenge against Kane, Rob Van Dam, and Batista to select his entry number for the Royal Rumble match. He chose number two in order to start the match with Shawn Michaels, who had challenged him to prove Jericho's claims that he was better than Michaels. After Michaels's entrance, Jericho entered as the second participant. Christian, in Jericho's attire, appeared while the real Jericho attacked Shawn from behind. He eliminated Michaels shortly afterward, but Michaels got his revenge later in the match by causing Test to eliminate Jericho. Jericho spent the most time of any other wrestler in that same Royal Rumble. Jericho simultaneously feuded with Test, Michaels, and Jeff Hardy, defeating Hardy at No Way Out. Jericho and Michaels fought again at WrestleMania XIX, which Michaels won. Jericho, however, attacked Michaels with a low blow after the match following an embrace.

After this match, Jericho entered a rivalry with Goldberg, which was fueled by Goldberg's refusal to fight Jericho in WCW. During Jericho's first episode of the Highlight Reel, an interview segment, where Goldberg was the guest, he complained that no-one wanted Goldberg in WWE and continued to insult him in the following weeks. On the May 12 episode of Raw, a mystery assailant attempted to run over Goldberg with a limousine. A week later, Co-Raw General Manager, Stone Cold Steve Austin, interrogated several Raw superstars to find out who was driving the car. One of the interrogates was Lance Storm, who admitted that he was the assailant. Austin forced Storm into a match with Goldberg, who defeated Storm. After the match, Goldberg forced Storm to admit that Jericho was the superstar who conspired Storm into running him over. On the May 26 episode of Raw, Goldberg was once again a guest on the Highlight Reel. Jericho expressed jealousy towards Goldberg's success in WCW and felt that since joining WWE, he had achieved everything he had ever wanted in his career and all that was left was to defeat Goldberg and challenged him to a match. At Bad Blood, Goldberg settled the score with Jericho and defeated him.

On the October 27 episode of Raw, Jericho won his sixth WWE Intercontinental Championship when he defeated Rob Van Dam. He lost the title back to Van Dam immediately after in a steel cage match. Later in 2003, Jericho started a romance with Trish Stratus while his tag team partner Christian began one with Lita. This, however, turned out to be a bet over who could sleep with their respective paramour first, with a Canadian dollar at stake. Stratus overheard this and ended her relationship with Jericho, who seemingly felt bad for using Stratus. After he saved her from an attack by Kane, Stratus agreed that the two of them could just be "friends", thus turning Jericho face. After Christian put Stratus in the Walls of Jericho while competing against her in a match, Jericho sought revenge on Christian, which led to a match at WrestleMania XX. Christian defeated Jericho after Stratus ran down and "inadvertently" struck Jericho (thinking it was Christian) and Christian got the roll-up. After the match, Stratus turned on Jericho and revealed that she and Christian were a couple. This revelation led to a handicap match at Backlash that Jericho won. Jericho won his record-breaking seventh WWE Intercontinental Championship at Unforgiven in a ladder match against Christian, breaking the previous record held by Jeff Jarrett from 1999. Jericho's seventh reign was short lived, as he lost it at Taboo Tuesday to Shelton Benjamin.

World championship pursuits and departure (2004–2005) 
Jericho teamed up with Randy Orton, Chris Benoit, and Maven to take on Triple H, Batista, Edge, and Gene Snitsky at Survivor Series. The match stipulated that each member of the winning team would be the general manager of Raw over the next four weeks. Jericho's team won, and took turns as general manager. During Jericho's turn as general manager, the World Heavyweight Championship was vacated because a Triple Threat match for the title a week earlier ended in a draw. At New Year's Revolution, Jericho competed in the Elimination Chamber against Triple H, Chris Benoit, Batista, Randy Orton, and Edge for the vacant World Heavyweight Championship. Jericho began the match with Benoit and eliminated Edge, but was eliminated by Batista. Triple H went on to win. At WrestleMania 21, Jericho participated in the first ever Money in the Bank ladder match. Jericho suggested the match concept, and he competed in the match against Benjamin, Benoit, Kane, Christian, and Edge. Jericho lost the match when Edge claimed the briefcase.

At Backlash, Jericho challenged Shelton Benjamin for the WWE Intercontinental Championship, but lost the match. Jericho lost to Lance Storm at ECW One Night Stand. Jericho used his old "Lionheart" gimmick, instead of his more well known "Y2J" gimmick. Jericho lost the match after Jason and Justin Credible hit Jericho with a Singapore cane, which allowed Storm to win the match. The next night on Raw, Jericho turned heel by betraying WWE Champion John Cena after defeating Christian and Tyson Tomko in a tag team match. Jericho lost a Triple Threat match for the WWE Championship at Vengeance which also involved Christian and Cena. The feud continued throughout the summer and Jericho lost to Cena in a WWE Championship match at SummerSlam.

The next night on the August 22 episode of Raw, Jericho faced Cena for the WWE Championship again in a rematch, this time in a "You're fired" match. Cena won again, and Jericho was fired by Raw General Manager Eric Bischoff. Jericho was carried out of the arena by security as Kurt Angle attacked Cena. Jericho's WWE contract expired on August 25.

Return to WWE (2007–2010)

Feud with Shawn Michaels (2007–2008) 

After a two-year hiatus, WWE promoted Jericho's return starting on the September 24, 2007, episode of Raw with a viral marketing campaign using a series of 15-second cryptic binary code videos, similar to the matrix digital rain used in The Matrix series. The videos contained hidden messages and biblical links related to Jericho. Jericho made his return to WWE television as a face on the November 19, 2007, episode of Raw when he interrupted Randy Orton during Orton's orchestrated "passing of the torch" ceremony. Jericho revealed his intentions to reclaim the WWE Championship in order to "save" WWE fans from Orton. On the November 26 episode of Raw, Jericho defeated Santino Marella and debuted a new finishing move called the Codebreaker. At Armageddon, he competed in a WWE title match against Orton, defeating him by disqualification when SmackDown!s color commentator John "Bradshaw" Layfield (JBL) interfered in the match, but Orton retained the title. He began a feud with JBL and met him at the Royal Rumble. Jericho was disqualified after hitting JBL with a steel chair. On the March 10 episode of Raw, Jericho captured the WWE Intercontinental Championship for a record eighth time when he defeated Jeff Hardy.

In April 2008, Jericho became involved in the ongoing feud between Shawn Michaels and Batista when he suggested that Michaels enjoyed retiring Ric Flair, causing Shawn Michaels to attack him. Jericho thus asked to be inserted into the match between Batista and Michaels at Backlash, but instead, he was appointed as the special guest referee. During the match at Backlash, Michaels feigned a knee injury so that Jericho would give him time to recover and lured Batista in for Sweet Chin Music for the win. After Backlash, Jericho accused Michaels of cheating, but Michaels continued to play up an injury. When Jericho was finally convinced and he apologized to Michaels for not believing him, Michaels then admitted to Jericho that he had faked his injury and he attacked Jericho with Sweet Chin Music. After losing to Michaels at Judgment Day, Jericho initiated a handshake after the match.

On the June 9 episode of Raw, Jericho hosted his talk show segment, The Highlight Reel, interviewing Michaels. Jericho pointed out that Michaels was still cheered by the fans despite Michaels's deceit and attack on Jericho during the previous months, whereas Jericho was booed when he tried to do the right thing. Jericho then assaulted Michaels with a low blow and sent Michaels through the "Jeritron 6000" television, damaging the eye of Michaels, and turning heel in the process. This began what was named by both Pro Wrestling Illustrated and the Wrestling Observer Newsletter the "Feud of the Year". At Night of Champions, Jericho lost the WWE Intercontinental title to Kofi Kingston after a distraction by Michaels. In June, Jericho took on Lance Cade as a protégé.

 World Heavyweight Champion (2008–2009) 

Afterward, Jericho developed a suit-wearing persona inspired by Javier Bardem's character Anton Chigurh from the 2007 film No Country for Old Men and wrestler Nick Bockwinkel. Jericho and Michaels met at The Great American Bash, which Jericho won after attacking the cut on Michaels's eye. At SummerSlam, Michaels said that his eye damage would force him to retire and insulted Jericho by saying he would never achieve Michaels's success. Jericho tried to attack Michaels, but Michaels ducked, so Jericho punched Michaels's wife, Rebecca, instead. As a result, they fought in an unsanctioned match at Unforgiven, which Jericho lost by referee stoppage. Later that night, Jericho entered the Championship Scramble match as a late replacement for the defending champion CM Punk and subsequently won the World Heavyweight Championship, defeating Batista, John "Bradshaw" Layfield (JBL), Kane, and Rey Mysterio. It was announced that Michaels would challenge Jericho for the championship in a ladder match at No Mercy, which Jericho won. At Cyber Sunday on October 26, Jericho lost the title to Batista, but later won it back eight days later on the 800th episode of Raw in a steel cage match. Jericho defeated Michaels in a Last Man Standing match on the November 10 episode of Raw after interference from JBL. Jericho lost the World Heavyweight Championship at Survivor Series to the returning John Cena. On the December 8 episode of Raw, Jericho was awarded the Slammy Award for 2008 Superstar of the Year award. Six days later, he lost his rematch with John Cena for the World Heavyweight Championship at Armageddon.

At the Royal Rumble on January 25, 2009, Jericho participated in the Royal Rumble match, but he was eliminated by the Undertaker. On February 15 at No Way Out, he competed in an Elimination Chamber match for the World Heavyweight Championship, but he failed to win as he was eliminated by Rey Mysterio. Following this, Jericho began a rivalry with veteran wrestlers Ric Flair, Ricky Steamboat, Jimmy Snuka and Roddy Piper, as well as actor Mickey Rourke. Jericho was originally arranged to face Rourke at WrestleMania 25, but Rourke later pulled out of the event. Instead, Jericho defeated Piper, Snuka and Steamboat in a 3-on-1 elimination handicap match at WrestleMania, but was knocked out by Rourke after the match.

On the April 13 episode of Raw, Jericho was drafted to the SmackDown brand as part of the 2009 WWE draft. Jericho then faced Steamboat in a singles match at Backlash, where Jericho was victorious. In May, Jericho started a feud with Intercontinental Champion Rey Mysterio, leading to a match at Judgment Day, which Jericho lost. However, Jericho defeated Mysterio in a No Holds Barred Match at Extreme Rules to win his ninth Intercontinental Championship, breaking his own record again. At The Bash, Jericho lost the Intercontinental Championship back to Mysterio in a mask vs. title match.

 Jeri-Show and feud with Edge (2009–2010) 

Later in the event, Jericho and his partner Edge won the Unified WWE Tag Team Championship as surprise entrants in a triple threat tag team match. As a result of this win, Jericho became the first wrestler to win every (original) Grand Slam eligible championship. Shortly thereafter Edge suffered an injury and Jericho revealed a clause in his contract to allow Edge to be replaced and Jericho's reign to continue uninterrupted. At Night of Champions, Jericho revealed Big Show as his new tag team partner, creating a team that would come to called Jeri-Show. The duo defeated Cody Rhodes and Ted DiBiase to retain the championship. Jeri-Show successfully defended the title against Cryme Tyme at SummerSlam, MVP and Mark Henry at Breaking Point and Rey Mysterio and Batista at Hell in a Cell. At Survivor Series, both Jericho and Big Show took part in a triple threat match for the World Heavyweight Championship, but the Undertaker successfully retained the title. At TLC: Tables, Ladders & Chairs, Jeri-Show lost the tag titles to D-Generation X (DX) (Shawn Michaels and Triple H) in a Tables, Ladders and Chairs match. As a member of the SmackDown brand, Jericho could only appear on Raw as a champion and DX intentionally disqualified themselves in a rematch to force Jericho off the show. On the January 4, 2010, episode of Raw, DX defeated Jeri-Show to retain the championship once again, marking the end of Jeri-Show.

Jericho entered the 2010 Royal Rumble match on January 31, but was eliminated by the returning Edge, his former tag team partner, who went on to win the match. At Elimination Chamber, Jericho won the World Heavyweight Championship in an Elimination Chamber match, defeating The Undertaker, John Morrison, Rey Mysterio, CM Punk and R-Truth following interference from Shawn Michaels. The next night on Raw, Edge used his Royal Rumble win to challenge Jericho for the World Heavyweight Championship at WrestleMania XXVI. Jericho defeated Edge at WrestleMania to retain the title, but lost the championship to Jack Swagger on the following episode of SmackDown, who cashed in his Money in the Bank contract. Jericho then failed to regain the title from Swagger in a triple-threat match also involving Edge on the April 16 episode of SmackDown. Jericho and Edge continued their feud leading into Extreme Rules, where Jericho was defeated in a steel cage match.

Jericho was drafted to the Raw brand in the 2010 WWE draft. He formed a brief tag team with The Miz and unsuccessfully challenged The Hart Dynasty for the Unified WWE Tag Team Championship at Over the Limit. A month later, Jericho lost to Evan Bourne at Fatal 4-Way, but won a rematch during the following night on Raw, where he put his career on the line. On the July 19 episode of Raw, after being assaulted by The Nexus, Jericho teamed with rivals Edge, John Morrison, R-Truth, Daniel Bryan and Bret Hart in a team led by John Cena to face The Nexus at SummerSlam. Jericho and Cena bickered over leadership of the team, which led to him and Edge attacking Cena during the SummerSlam match that they won.

Jericho was punished for not showing solidarity against Nexus, when he was removed from a Six-Pack Challenge for Sheamus's WWE Championship at Night of Champions. Although he re-earned his place in the match after defeating The Hart Dynasty in a handicap steel cage match, he was the first man eliminated from the match at Night of Champions. On the September 27 episode of Raw, Jericho faced Randy Orton who punted him in the head. This was used to explain Jericho's departure from the company.

 Second return to WWE (2011–2018) 
 Feud with CM Punk (2011–2012) 

Beginning in November 2011, WWE aired cryptic vignettes that promoted a wrestler's return on the January 2, 2012, episode of Raw. On his return, after hyping the crowd and relishing their cheers for a prolonged period, Jericho left without verbally addressing his return. After exhibiting similar odd behavior in the proceeding two weeks, Jericho spoke on the January 23 episode of Raw to say, "This Sunday at the Royal Rumble, it is going to be the end of the world as you know it", but in the Royal Rumble match, he was eliminated last, by Sheamus. On the January 30 episode of Raw, Jericho began a feud with WWE Champion CM Punk after attacking him during his match with Daniel Bryan. He explained his actions by claiming other wrestlers in WWE were imitating him and named Punk as the worst offender.

At Elimination Chamber, Jericho participated in the Elimination Chamber match for the WWE Championship, entering last and eliminating Dolph Ziggler and Kofi Kingston before being knocked out of the structure by Punk, which injured him and removed him from the match without being eliminated. The following night on Raw, Jericho won a ten-man battle royal to become the number one contender for Punk's WWE Championship at WrestleMania XXVIII. In a bid to psychologically unsettle Punk, Jericho revealed that Punk's father was an alcoholic and Punk's sister was a drug addict, which contradicted Punk's straight edge philosophy; Jericho vowed to make Punk turn to alcohol by winning Punk's title from him. At WrestleMania, a stipulation was added that Punk would lose his WWE Championship if he was disqualified. During the match, Jericho unsuccessfully tried to taunt Punk into disqualifying himself, and Punk won the match.

Jericho continued his feud with Punk in the weeks that followed by attacking and dousing him with alcohol after his matches. At Extreme Rules, Jericho failed again to capture the WWE Championship from Punk in a Chicago Street Fight.

 Championship pursuits (2012–2013) 
Jericho faced Randy Orton, Alberto Del Rio and Sheamus in a fatal four-way match for the World Heavyweight Championship at Over the Limit, where Sheamus retained his title. On May 24 at a WWE live event in Brazil, Jericho wrestled a match against CM Punk, during which Jericho kicked a Brazilian flag, causing local police to intervene and threaten Jericho with arrest. Jericho issued an apology to the audience, enabling the event to resume. The following day, WWE suspended Jericho for 30 days while apologizing to the people and government of Brazil. Jericho returned on the June 25 episode of Raw, and his absence was explained by a European tour with his band Fozzy which happened to coincide with his suspension. At Money in the Bank, Jericho participated in the WWE Championship Money in the Bank ladder match, but failed to win as John Cena won. The following night on Raw, Jericho confronted newly crowned Mr. Money in the Bank, Dolph Ziggler, who claimed that Jericho had lost his touch. Jericho attacked Ziggler with a Codebreaker, thus turning face in the process. At SummerSlam, Jericho defeated Ziggler. The following night on Raw, Ziggler defeated Jericho in a rematch and, as a result, Ziggler retained his Money in the Bank contract and Jericho's WWE contract was terminated as per a pre match stipulation put in place by Raw General Manager, AJ Lee. This was used to write him off so he could tour with Fozzy for the remainder of the year.

On January 27, 2013, Jericho returned after a five-month hiatus entering the Royal Rumble match as the second entrant. Jericho lasted over 47 minutes before being eliminated by Dolph Ziggler. The following night on Raw, Jericho later revealed to Ziggler that due to a managerial change on Raw, he had been rehired by Vickie Guerrero, resuming his feud with Ziggler. Guerrero then paired the two in a match against WWE Tag Team Champions Team Hell No (Daniel Bryan and Kane). The match ended with Ziggler being pinned by Kane after Jericho framed him for pushing Kane. After beating Daniel Bryan on the February 11 episode of Raw, Jericho qualified for the Elimination Chamber match at Elimination Chamber (in which the winner would go on to be the number one contender for the World Heavyweight Championship at WrestleMania 29), where he was the fourth man eliminated. On the March 11 episode of Raw, Jericho faced The Miz in a No. 1 contenders match for Wade Barrett's WWE Intercontinental Championship, but the match was ruled a no contest after Barrett interfered and attacked both men. Both men then faced Barrett the following week on Raw, where he retained his title. Earlier in the episode, Jericho had a run-in with Fandango which led to Fandango costing him his match with Jack Swagger and attacking him four days later on SmackDown. At WrestleMania 29, Jericho was defeated by Fandango. They continued their feud in the following weeks, until Jericho defeated Fandango at Extreme Rules. He then faced the returning CM Punk at Payback, where he was defeated. Jericho then began feuding with Ryback, which led to a singles match on July 14 at Money in the Bank, where Ryback emerged victorious. On the July 19 episode of SmackDown, Jericho unsuccessfully challenged Curtis Axel for the WWE Intercontinental Championship and was afterwards attacked by Ryback. This was done to write Jericho off television as he was taking a temporary hiatus to tour with Fozzy for the remainder of the year and possibly January and February.

In a November interview for WWE.com, Jericho revealed that he would not be a full-time wrestler due to his musical and acting ventures.

 Various sporadic feuds (2014–2016) 
After an eleven-month hiatus, Jericho returned on the June 30, 2014, episode of Raw, attacking The Miz, who had also returned minutes earlier. The Wyatt Family then interrupted and ultimately attacked Jericho. Jericho faced Bray Wyatt at Battleground in a winning effort. At SummerSlam, with Wyatt Family members Luke Harper and Erick Rowan banned from ringside, Wyatt picked up the victory. On the September 8 episode of Raw, Jericho lost to Wyatt in a steel cage match, ending the feud. Jericho then feuded with Randy Orton, who had attacked him the week before after his match against Wyatt in the trainers room. Orton defeated him at Night of Champions. Throughout the rest of October and November, Jericho wrestled exclusively at live events, defeating Bray Wyatt. Jericho returned to WWE television in December as the guest general manager of the December 15 episode of Raw. Jericho booked himself in a street fight against Paul Heyman in the main event, which led to the return of Brock Lesnar. Before the match could begin, Lesnar attacked Jericho with an F-5.

In January 2015, Jericho revealed that he signed an exclusive WWE contract, under which he would compete at 16 house shows only. He later signed a similar contract once the former expired and competed at house shows throughout the rest of 2015. During this time he wrestled against the likes of Luke Harper, Kevin Owens and King Barrett in winning efforts. In May 2015, Jericho was one of the hosts of Tough Enoughs sixth season. Jericho also hosted two Live! With Chris Jericho specials on the WWE Network during 2015; his guests were John Cena and Stephanie McMahon. Jericho made his televised return at The Beast in the East, defeating Neville. At Night of Champions, Jericho was revealed as the mystery partner of Roman Reigns and Dean Ambrose, facing The Wyatt Family in a losing effort. On October 3, Jericho unsuccessfully challenged Kevin Owens for the WWE Intercontinental Championship at Live from Madison Square Garden. The match marked 20 years since Jericho's debut with ECW while also celebrating his 25th year as a professional wrestler in total.

On the January 4, 2016, episode of Raw, Jericho returned to in-ring competition full-time and confronted The New Day. At the 2016 Royal Rumble, Jericho entered as the sixth entrant, lasting over 50 minutes, before being eliminated by Dean Ambrose. On the January 25 episode of Raw, Jericho faced the recently debuted AJ Styles in a losing effort. Following the match, after initial hesitation by Jericho, the pair shook hands. On the February 11 episode of SmackDown, Jericho defeated Styles. At Fastlane, Styles was victorious in a third match between the pair. On the February 22 episode of Raw, Jericho and Styles formed a tag team, dubbed Y2AJ. Following their loss against The New Day on the March 7 episode of Raw, Jericho attacked Styles, ending their alliance, claiming that he was sick of the fans chanting for Styles instead of him, turning heel in the process. Their feud culminated at WrestleMania 32, where Jericho defeated Styles. However, on the April 4 episode of Raw, Jericho competed in a fatal-four-way match against Styles, Kevin Owens and Cesaro to determine the No. 1 contender for the WWE World Heavyweight Championship in a losing effort after being pinned by Styles, ending their feud.

The following week on Raw, Dean Ambrose interrupted The Highlight Reel, handing Jericho a note from Shane McMahon replacing the show with The Ambrose Asylum, igniting a feud between the two. During this time, Jericho tweaked his gimmick. He became arrogant and childish while wearing expensive scarfs and calling everyone who appeased him "stupid idiots". At Payback, Jericho faced Ambrose in a losing effort. After attacking one another and Ambrose destroying Jericho's light-up ring jacket, Jericho was challenged by Ambrose to an Asylum match at Extreme Rules, where Ambrose again defeated Jericho after Jericho was thrown in a pile of thumbtacks. On the May 23 episode of Raw, Jericho defeated Apollo Crews to qualify for the Money in the Bank ladder match at the Money in the Bank pay-per-view, where Jericho was unsuccessful as the match was won by Ambrose. On July 19 at the 2016 WWE draft, Jericho was drafted to the Raw brand. At Battleground on July 24, Jericho hosted a Highlight Reel segment with the returning Randy Orton, where he took an RKO from Orton after he insulted him. The next night on Raw, Jericho competed in a fatal four-way match to determine the number one contender for the newly created WWE Universal Championship at SummerSlam, but he was unsuccessful, as Roman Reigns won the match.

 The List of Jericho (2016–2017) 

Jericho then entered a feud with Enzo and Cass and on the August 1 episode of Raw, he teamed with Charlotte to defeat Enzo Amore and then WWE Women's Champion Sasha Banks in a mixed tag team match, after which Big Cass made the save as Jericho continued the assault on Amore. The following week on Raw, Jericho allied with Kevin Owens and later defeated Amore via disqualification when Cass interfered. This led to a tag team match at SummerSlam, where Jericho and Owens defeated Enzo and Cass. On the August 22 episode of Raw, Jericho interfered in Owens's match against Neville, allowing him to qualify for the fatal four-way match to determine the new WWE Universal Champion on the August 29 episode of Raw, which Owens won.

On the September 12 episode of Raw, Jericho hosted an episode of The Highlight Reel with Sami Zayn as his guest, who questioned his alliance with Owens, resulting in Jericho defending Owens and attacking Zayn. On the September 19 episode of Raw, as a result of feeling that he was being treated unjustly by General Manager Mick Foley, as well as other wrestlers beginning to annoy him, Jericho began a list called "The List of Jericho", where he wrote down the name of the person that bothered him and why. If someone annoyed Jericho, he would ask "you know what happens?" before shouting "you just made the list!" and writing the person's name down. The List of Jericho soon became incredibly popular with the fans, with many critics describing Jericho and his list as "easily one of the best moments of Raw's broadcast". At Clash of Champions on September 25, Jericho defeated Zayn and assisted Owens in his Universal Championship defense against Seth Rollins. At Hell in a Cell on October 30, Jericho aided Owens in retaining the Universal Championship against Rollins in a Hell in a Cell match after Owens sprayed a fire extinguisher at the referee, allowing Jericho to enter the cell.

Jericho teamed with Owens, Braun Strowman, Roman Reigns, and Seth Rollins as part of Team Raw at Survivor Series on November 20, in a losing effort. The next night on Raw, despite being banned from ringside, Jericho showed up in a Sin Cara mask and attacked Rollins, in another successful title defense for Owens. The following week on Raw, tensions between Jericho and Owens arose after both said that they did not need each other anymore, and Jericho was later attacked by Rollins in the parking lot. At Roadblock: End of the Line on December 18, Jericho lost to Rollins after Owens failed in his attempt to help him, Later that night, Jericho intentionally attacked Owens to prevent Reigns from winning the title. After both Jericho and Owens failed to win the WWE United States Championship from Reigns in multiple singles matches in late 2016, Jericho pinned Reigns in a handicap match also involving Owens on the January 9 episode of Raw to win the WWE United States Championship. Thus, Jericho won his first championship in nearly seven years and also become Grand Slam winner under the current format. Due to interfering multiple times in Owens's matches, Jericho was suspended above the ring in a shark proof cage during Reigns's rematch at the Royal Rumble pay-per-view event. Owens nonetheless retained the championship after Braun Strowman, taking advantage of the added no disqualification stipulation, interfered. Also at the event, Jericho entered as the second entrant in the Royal Rumble match, lasting over an hour (thus breaking the record with a cumulative time of over five hours) and being the third to last before being eliminated by Reigns.

In February, tensions grew between Jericho and Owens after Jericho accepted a Universal Championship challenge from Goldberg on Owens's behalf, much to the latter's dismay. On the February 13 episode of Raw, Jericho held a "Festival of Friendship" for Owens, who was not impressed and viciously attacked Jericho, ending their alliance. Jericho returned at Fastlane on March 5, distracting Owens during his match with Goldberg and causing Owens to lose the Universal Championship, turning face again in the process. This led to a match between Jericho and Owens being arranged for WrestleMania 33 on April 2, with Jericho's United States Championship on the line. At WrestleMania, Jericho lost the United States Championship to Owens. At Payback on April 30, Jericho defeated Owens to regain the title and moved to the SmackDown brand, but lost it back to him two nights later on SmackDown. Following the match, Owens attacked Jericho, who was carried out on a stretcher. Thus, Jericho was written off television so he could fulfill his commitments to tour with and promote his new album with Fozzy. Jericho made a surprise return at a house show in Singapore on June 28, where he lost to Hideo Itami.

 Final matches and departure (2017–2018) 
On the July 25 episode of SmackDown, Jericho made his televised return, interrupting an altercation between Kevin Owens and AJ Styles to get his rematch for Owens' WWE United States Championship. Later that night, Jericho participated in a triple threat match against Owens and Styles for the title in which Jericho was pinned by Styles. Show took place in Richmond, Virginia and was Jericho's last in-ring appearance for WWE in the United States.

On January 22, 2018, during the 25th Anniversary of Raw, Jericho appeared backstage in a segment with Elias, putting him on The List of Jericho. At the Greatest Royal Rumble, Jericho was the last entrant in the 50-man Royal Rumble match, eliminating Shelton Benjamin before being eliminated by the eventual winner Braun Strowman. This event marked Jericho's final appearance with WWE.

In September 2019, during an interview for the Mature Audiences Mayhem Podcast, Jericho explained that an incident occurred that made him finalize a decision to leave WWE. Even though Jericho was with the WWE for 15 years, at WrestleMania 33 in 2017, the match between Jericho and Kevin Owens (an established feud) was marked as second place on the WrestleMania match card for the United States Championship. The decision, made by Vince McMahon, prompted Jericho to seek work elsewhere.

 Cameo (2022) 
On the June 27, 2022 episode of Raw, Jericho made an appearance via video message to congratulate John Cena on his career.

 Return to NJPW (2017–2020) 
 Feud with Kenny Omega (2017–2018) 
On November 5, 2017, Jericho returned to NJPW in a pre-taped vignette, challenging Kenny Omega to a match at Wrestle Kingdom 12 in Tokyo Dome. The challenge was immediately accepted by Omega and made official by NJPW the following day as a title match for Omega's IWGP United States Heavyweight Championship. The match, dubbed "Alpha vs. Omega", was Jericho's first match outside of WWE since he left WCW in July 1999. Journalist Dave Meltzer wrote that Jericho's WWE contract had expired and that he was a "free agent". NJPW also referred to Jericho as a free agent. In contrast, the Tokyo Sports newspaper described an anonymous NJPW official saying that Jericho is still under contract with WWE, and that WWE chairman Vince McMahon had given him permission to wrestle this match in NJPW. This was his first NJPW match in nearly 20 years. Jericho returned in person at the December 11 World Tag League show, attacking and bloodying Omega after his match, while also laying out a referee, a young lion and color commentator Don Callis, establishing himself as a heel. The following day at the Wrestle Kingdom 12 in Tokyo Dome press conference, Jericho and Omega would get into a second physical altercation. Because of the two incidents, NJPW turned the January 4 match into a no disqualification match. At the event, Jericho was defeated by Omega. It was later revealed that the match was awarded a five-star rating from Dave Meltzer of the Wrestling Observer Newsletter. This was the first of his career.

 IWGP Intercontinental Champion (2018–2019) 

The night after Wrestle Kingdom 12 in Tokyo Dome at New Year Dash!! 2018, Jericho attacked Tetsuya Naito. On May 4, Jericho once again attacked Naito at Wrestling Dontaku, leading to a match between the two at Dominion 6.9 in Osaka-jo Hall, in which he defeated Naito to win the IWGP Intercontinental Championship. At King of Pro-Wrestling, Jericho attacked Evil before his match against Zack Sabre Jr. Backstage, Jericho challenged Evil to an IWGP Intercontinental Championship title match at Power Struggle. At the event, Jericho made Evil submit to the Liontamer to retain the IWGP Intercontinental Championship. After the match, Jericho refused to release the hold until Tetsuya Naito ran in for the save and challenged Jericho. Despite Jericho stating that Naito would not receive a rematch, the match was made official for Wrestle Kingdom 13 in Tokyo Dome. On December 15, NJPW held a press conference for Jericho and Naito's IWGP Intercontinental Championship match. The press conference ended when Naito spat water in Jericho's face, which resulted in the two then brawling before being separated. Later that same day during a Road to Tokyo Dome show, Jericho laid out Naito with steel chair shots, and after stated that at Wrestle Kingdom 13 he would end Tetsuya Naito's career. At the event, Jericho was defeated by Naito, losing the IWGP Intercontinental Championship in the process.

 Sporadic appearances (2019–2020) 
At Dominion 6.9 in Osaka-jo Hall, Jericho challenged Kazuchika Okada for the IWGP Heavyweight Championship but was defeated. Following the match, Jericho attacked Okada, leading to Hiroshi Tanahashi making the save. Jericho returned at Power Struggle on November 3 and challenged Tanahashi to a match at Wrestle Kingdom 14. On December 28, it was announced that if Tanahashi were to defeat Jericho, he would be granted an AEW World Championship match at a later date. During the second night of Wrestle Kingdom on January 5, 2020, Jericho defeated Tanahashi.

 Return to the independent circuit (2018–2019, 2023) 
On September 1, 2018, Jericho (disguised as Penta El Zero) appeared at the All In show promoted by Cody and The Young Bucks, where he attacked Kenny Omega following Omega's victory over Penta to promote his upcoming Rock 'N' Wrestling Rager at Sea cruise.

In October 2018, Jericho organized Chris Jericho's Rock 'N' Wrestling Rager at Sea, a series of professional wrestling matches originating from Jericho's cruise ship, which embarked from Miami, Florida and featured wrestlers from Ring of Honor.

On May 3, 2019, Jericho appeared at a Southern Honor Wrestling event, where he was attacked by Kenny Omega.

On January 8, 2023, Jericho made his debut for Pro Wrestling Guerrilla (PWG), as part of PWG Battle of Los Angeles 2023 night 2, where he teamed with the Jericho Appreciation Society (Daniel Garcia, Angelo Parker, Matt Menard and Sammy Guevara) to defeat the team of Jonathan Gresham, Kevin Blackwood, Michael Oku, Player Uno, and SB Kento in ten-man tag team match.

 All Elite Wrestling and Ring of Honor (2019-Present) 
 Inaugural AEW World Champion (2019–2020) 

On January 8, 2019, Jericho made a surprise appearance at a media event organized by the upstart All Elite Wrestling (AEW) promotion. Shortly afterwards, Jericho was filmed signing a full-time performers three-year contract with AEW and shaking hands with the company's President Tony Khan. Jericho defeated Kenny Omega at the promotion's inaugural event Double or Nothing on May 25, and went on to defeat Adam Page at All Out to become the inaugural AEW World Champion.

On the premiere episode of Dynamite on October 2, Jericho allied himself with Sammy Guevara, Jake Hager, Santana and Ortiz, creating a stable that would be known as The Inner Circle. Jericho would make successful title defences against Darby Allin on the October 16 episode of Dynamite and Cody at the Full Gear pay-per-view on November 9. On the episode of Dynamite after Full Gear, Jericho and Guevara challenged SoCal Uncensored (Frankie Kazarian and Scorpio Sky) for the AEW World Tag Team Championship, but they failed to win when Sky pinned Jericho with a small package, thus suffering his first loss in AEW. Jericho would successfully retain the AEW World Championship against Sky on the November 27 episode of Dynamite.

In December, The Inner Circle began to attempt to entice Jon Moxley to join the group. On the January 8, 2020, episode of Dynamite, Moxley initially joined the group, however, this was later revealed to be a ruse from Moxley as he attacked Jericho and Sammy Guevara. Moxley then became the number one contender for Jericho's championship at Revolution on February 29, where Moxley defeated Jericho to win the title, ending his inaugural AEW World Championship reign at 182 days.

 Feud with MJF (2020–2021) 
After losing the championship, Jericho and The Inner Circle began a feud with The Elite (Adam Page, Cody, Kenny Omega and The Young Bucks), who recruited the debuting Matt Hardy to oppose them. At Double or Nothing on May 23, The Inner Circle were defeated by Page, Omega, The Young Bucks and Hardy in a Stadium Stampede match. Jericho next began a rivalry with Orange Cassidy, with Jericho defeating him at Fyter Fest on July 8, but losing a rematch on the August 12 episode of Dynamite. The two faced once again at All Out on September 5, in a Mimosa Mayhem match, which Jericho lost.

Beginning in October, Jericho began a feud with MJF, who requested to join the Inner Circle, despite disapproval from Sammy Guevara, Santana and Ortiz. Jericho and MJF wrestled in a match at the Full Gear event on November 7, which MJF won, thus allowing him to join the Inner Circle. At Beach Break on February 3, 2021, Jericho and MJF won a tag team battle royal to become the number one contenders for the AEW World Tag Team Championship at the Revolution event against The Young Bucks, which they were unsuccessful in winning. On the March 10 episode of Dynamite, MJF betrayed and left The Inner Circle after revealing he had been secretly plotting against them and building his own stable, The Pinnacle—consisting of Wardlow, Shawn Spears and FTR (Cash Wheeler and Dax Harwood). At Blood and Guts on May 5, The Inner Circle lost to The Pinnacle in the inaugural Blood and Guts match. However, in the main event of Double or Nothing later that month, The Inner Circle defeated The Pinnacle in a Stadium Stampede match, after Sammy Guevara pinned Shawn Spears. Jericho then began pursuing another match with MJF, who stated that he would first have to defeat a gauntlet of opponents selected by MJF, in a series dubbed the "Labors of Jericho". Jericho would defeat each of MJF's handpicked opponents (Shawn Spears, Nick Gage, Juventud Guerrera and Wardlow) and faced MJF in the final labor on the August 18 episode of Dynamite, but he was defeated. Jericho demanded one more match, stipulating that if he lost, he would retire from in-ring competition, which MJF accepted. At All Out on September 5, Jericho defeated MJF to maintain his career and end their feud.

 Jericho Appreciation Society (2021–present) 

Following All Out, The Inner Circle started a rivalry with Men of the Year (Ethan Page and Scorpio Sky), and their ally, mixed martial arts (MMA) coach Dan Lambert. Lambert also brought in members of his MMA team American Top Team (ATT) to oppose The Inner Circle, including former UFC Heavyweight Champions Andrei Arlovski and Junior dos Santos. At the Full Gear event on November 13, The Inner Circle defeated Men of the Year and ATT in a Minneapolis Street Fight. At Revolution, Jericho was defeated by Eddie Kingston. After the match, Jericho refused to shake Kingston's hand. On March 9, 2022, Jericho turned heel by attacking Kingston and Santana & Ortiz with a help of 2.0 and Daniel Garcia, ending the Inner Circle. At Double or Nothing, The Jericho Appreciation Society defeated the Blackpool Combat Club (Jon Moxley and Bryan Danielson), Eddie Kingston, Santana and Ortiz in an Anarchy in the Arena match. The Jericho Appreciation Society and Blackpool Combat Club feud continued through 2022 and saw the return of Jericho's Lionheart persona in matches with Moxley and Danielson. At Dynamite: Grand Slam on September 21, Jericho defeated Claudio Castagnoli to win the ROH World Championship for the first time in his career. On October 18, it was revealed that Jericho had signed a contract extension with AEW through December 2025. With this extension, Jericho received new roles as a coach and creative consultant, in addition to performing for AEW as an in-ring wrestler. During his reign as Ring of Honor World Champion, Jericho referred to himself as "The Ocho" (as it marked his eighth overall world championship) and successfully defended the title against many former ROH champions, such as Dalton Castle, Colt Cabana, Tomohiro Ishii and Bandido. Jericho also began stating his intention to destroy Ring of Honor, attacking Ring of Honor personnel, such as commentator Ian Riccaboni and ring announcer Bobby Cruise. This angered Castagnoli who reignited his feud with Jericho. On the November 25th edition of Rampage Jericho granted Castagnoli with a title match at Final Battle, with the stipulation that if Claudio lost, he would be forced to join the Jericho Appreciation Society. At Final Battle, Jericho lost the ROH World Championship back to Castagnoli, ending his reign at 80 days. On the "Winter is Coming" episode of AEW Dynamite, Jericho lost to Action Andretti in an upset that drew comparisons to the May 17, 1993 bout between Razor Ramon and The Kid.

 Legacy 
Known for his over-the-top, rock star persona, Jericho has been described by multiple industry commentators as one of the greatest professional wrestlers of all time. Journalist Chris Van Vliet noted that his name is "always thrown around as the GOAT [greatest of all time], or at least one of the GOATs", with Van Vliet himself asserting that Jericho is "if not the best, certainly one of the best". Todd Martin of the Pro Wrestling Torch remarked, to agreement from editor Wade Keller, that Jericho is "one of the great wrestlers of all time" and in "a lofty category", while likening his oeuvre to those of WWE Hall of Famers Randy Savage, Ricky Steamboat, Ted DiBiase and Dory Funk Jr. Praised for his ability to continually evolve his gimmick, Jericho was dubbed by KC Joyner of ESPN as "wrestling's David Bowie".

Various outlets have included Jericho in lists of the greatest wrestlers ever. Baltimore Sun reporter Kevin Eck, who has also served as editor of WCW Magazine and a WWE producer, featured Jericho in his "Top 10 favorite wrestlers of all time" and "Top 10 all-around performers"—the former piece noting that Jericho is "regarded as one of the very best talkers in the business". Keisha Hatchett in TV Guide wrote that Jericho "owns the mic with cerebral insults" and is set apart from peers by "his charismatic presence, which is highlighted by a laundry list of unforgettable catchphrases". He was voted by Wrestling Observer Newsletter (WON) readers as "Best on Interviews" for the 2000s decade, coinciding with his 2010 induction into the WON Hall of Fame. Fans also named Jericho the greatest WWE Intercontinental Champion of all time in a 2013 WWE poll, affording him a landslide 63% victory over the other four contenders (Mr. Perfect, The Honky Tonk Man, Rick Rude and Pat Patterson).

Chris Jericho's feud with Shawn Michaels and their series of matches, particularly their ladder match at No Mercy in 2008 received critical acclaim. Wrestling Observer Newsletter neamed their feud the "feud of the year" and the ladder match the "match of the year".

A number of Jericho's industry colleagues have hailed him as one of the greatest wrestlers in history. Kurt Angle labelled him the single greatest performer of all time. Stone Cold Steve Austin lauded his consistently "dynamic" promos and in-ring work, while arguing that he should be considered among the 10 best ever. Kenny Omega asserted that Jericho "has a legit argument for being the best of all time", based on his ability to achieve success and notoriety across numerous territories. Jon Moxley said, "Jericho is really making a case for being the greatest of all time... he's doing it again, he's doing something completely new, and breaking new barriers still here in 2020." Matt Striker pointed to Jericho's "magnanimous" nature as a contributing factor to his status as an all-time great; his willingness to impart knowledge was commended by James Ellsworth, who described Jericho as an "outstanding human being" and a childhood favorite. Kevin Owens stated that "Jericho was always someone I looked up to", while The Miz affirmed that he was part of a generation of young wrestlers who sought to "emulate" Jericho.

WWE declared Jericho a "marquee draw" with a "reputation as one of the best ever". As of 2019, he is one of the ten most prolific pay-per-view performers in company history.

After Jericho signed with All Elite Wrestling, it was said his role was similar to Terry Funk in ECW, as an experienced veteran bringing credibility to a younger promotion. Jericho was credited as one of the key attractions of AEW's weekly television broadcasts, leading to him adopting the nickname "The Demo God" due to many of the segments he appeared in being some of the highest viewed in the key demographics. He was voted as the Best Box Office Draw by readers of the Wrestling Observer Newsletter in 2019.

 Music career 

Jericho is the lead singer for the heavy metal band Fozzy. Since their debut album in 2000, Fozzy have released seven studio albums; Fozzy, Happenstance, All That Remains, Chasing the Grail, Sin and Bones, Do You Wanna Start a War, Judas, and one live album, Remains Alive.

In 2005, Jericho performed vocals on a cover of "The Evil That Men Do" on the Iron Maiden tribute album, Numbers from the Beast. He made a guest appearance on Dream Theater's album, Systematic Chaos on the song "Repentance", as one of several musical guests recorded apologizing to important people in their lives for wrongdoings in the past.

In the mid-1990s, Jericho wrote a monthly column for Metal Edge magazine focused on the heavy metal scene. The column ran for about a year. He started his own weekly XM Satellite Radio show in March 2005 called The Rock of Jericho, which aired Sunday nights on XM 41 The Boneyard.

 Discography 

 Albums with Fozzy
 Fozzy (2000)
 Happenstance (2002)
 All That Remains (2005)
 Chasing the Grail (2010)
 Sin and Bones (2012)
 Do You Wanna Start a War (2014)
 Judas (2017)
 Boombox (2022)
 Live albums
 Remains Alive (2009)
 As guest
 Don't You Wish You Were Me? - WWE Originals (2004)
King of the Night Time World - Spin the Bottle: An All-Star Tribute to Kiss (2004) * With Rich Ward, Mike Inez, Fred Coury
Bullet for My Valentine – Temper Temper – Dead to the World (2013)
 Devin Townsend – Dark Matters (2014)
 Michael Sweet – I'm Not Your Suicide – Anybody Else (2014)

 Other endeavors 

 Film, theater, comedy, and writing 

In 2000, a WWE produced VHS tape documenting Jericho's career titled Break Down the Walls was released. He later received two three disc sets profiling matches and interviews.

On June 24, 2006, Jericho premiered in his first Sci-Fi Channel movie Android Apocalypse alongside Scott Bairstow and Joey Lawrence.

Jericho debuted as a stage actor in a comedy play Opening Night, which premiered at the Toronto Centre for the Arts during July 20–22, 2006, in Toronto. During his stay in Toronto, Jericho hosted the sketch comedy show Sunday Night Live with sketch troupe The Sketchersons at The Brunswick House.

Jericho was also the first wrestler attached and interviewed for the wrestling documentary, Bloodstained Memoirs. The interview was recorded in the UK during a Fozzy tour in 2006.

Jericho wrote his autobiography, A Lion's Tale: Around the World in Spandex, which was released on October 25, 2007, and became a New York Times bestseller. It covers Jericho's life and wrestling career up to his debut in the WWE. Jericho's second autobiography, Undisputed: How to Become the World Champion in 1,372 Easy Steps, was released on February 16, 2011, and covers his wrestling career since his WWE debut. On October 14, 2014, Jericho's third book, The Best In The World...At What I Have No Idea, was released. It covers some untold stories of the "Save Us" era, his Fozzy career, and his multiple returns from 2011 to 2013. Jericho's fourth book, No Is a Four-Letter Word: How I Failed Spelling but Succeeded in Life, was released on August 29, 2017, and details twenty valuable lessons Jericho learned throughout his career as a wrestler and musician.

Jericho appeared in the 2009 film Albino Farm. In the film MacGruber, released May 21, 2010, he briefly appeared as Frank Korver, a former military teammate of the eponymous Green Beret, Navy Seal, and Army Ranger.

Jericho released a comedy web series on October 29, 2013, that is loosely based on his life entitled But I'm Chris Jericho! Jericho plays a former wrestler, struggling to make it big as an actor. A second season was produced in 2017 by CBC and distributed over CBC's television app and CBC.ca.

In 2016, Jericho starred in the documentary film Nine Legends alongside Mike Tyson and other wrestlers.

In August 2018, Jericho was confirmed to star in the film KillRoy Was Here.

On March 14, 2019, filmmaker Kevin Smith cast Jericho as a KKK Grand Wizard in Jay and Silent Bob Reboot.

 Television 
Jericho was a contributor to the VH1 pop culture shows Best Week Ever, I Love the '80s, and VH1's top 100 artists.

Jericho also hosted the five-part, five-hour VH1 special 100 Most Shocking Music Moments, an update of the original special 100 Most Shocking Moments in Rock N' Roll first hosted by Mark McGrath of Sugar Ray.

On July 12, 2006, he made an appearance on G4's Attack of the Show!; he made a second appearance on August 21, 2009. In May 2006, Jericho appeared on VH1's 40 Greatest Metal Songs and Heavy: The Story of Metal as a commentator.

He was one of eight celebrities in the 2006 Fox Television singing reality show Celebrity Duets, produced by Simon Cowell, and was the first contestant eliminated. Jericho worked at a McDonald's to show off his skills while prepping for the show.

Jericho hosted his own reality show in 2008 titled Redemption Song, in which 11 women tried their hand at getting into the music scene. It was shown on Fuse TV.

He guest starred as Billy "The Body Bag" Cobb in "Xero Control", an episode of the Disney XD 2009 original series Aaron Stone.

He hosted VH1's 100 Most Shocking Music Moments, which began airing in December 2009. In June 2010, Jericho was named the host of the ABC prime-time game show Downfall.

On March 1, 2011, Chris Jericho was named one of the contestants on the 2011 lineup of Dancing with the Stars. His partner was two-time champion Cheryl Burke. This led to a wave of publicity, including an interview with Jay Leno. On April 26, Jericho was the fifth contestant eliminated on the show.

On May 5, Jericho made his third appearance as a guest on Attack of the Show! where he depicted Thor. He promoted Undisputed and hosted the Revolver Golden Gods Awards on May 28 on VH1 Classic. On January 17, 2012, Jericho made his fourth appearance on Attack of the Show! in a segment called "Twitter Twister" where he portrayed a character called "The Twistercutioner" and read tweets as instructions for a game of Twister between Kevin and Candace. Jericho hosted the UK's Metal Hammer Golden Gods Awards in 2012 and 2017.

On February 26, 2013, Jericho began hosting a robot combat competition program on SyFy titled Robot Combat League the series ended on April 23, 2015.

In 2022, Jericho competed in season eight of The Masked Singer as "Bride" which resembles a dragon-like Kaiju in a wedding dress. After besting George Foreman as "Venus Fly Trap" and George Clinton as "Gopher" on "Hall of Fame Night", he was eliminated on "Comedy Roast Night" alongside Adam Carolla as "Avocado".

 Talk Is Jericho podcast 
In December 2013, Jericho began hosting his own podcast, Talk is Jericho. Episodes usually include a loosely scripted monolog before an interview, typically with a wrestler, rock musician or paranormal expert. The show originally appeared on PodcastOne, before moving to the WestwoodOne network in 2018. Notable guests on the show include Bruce Dickinson from Iron Maiden, Lemmy from Motörhead, Paul Stanley from KISS, Zak Bagans from Ghost Adventures, pornographic actress Asa Akira, writer/director Kevin Smith and many former and current wrestlers.

In April 2015, Jericho hosted his own video podcast on the WWE Network, Live! with Chris Jericho, with John Cena as his first guest, followed by Stephanie McMahon as his guest later that same month.

Once he signed with AEW, he was no longer allowed to have WWE performers as guests on the podcast.

 Web 
On August 10, 2019, Jericho launched his own dirtsheet website called WebIsJericho.com. The website is dedicated to the memory of Axl Rotten.

In May 2020, Jericho officially joined as a competitor of the Movie Trivia Schmoedown under manager Roxy Striar in the Roxstars faction. Jericho first expressed interest in the Schmoedown following an appearance on Collider Live with Striar and Schmoedown commissioner Kristian Harloff. He became friends with Striar following the interview and kept in contact. During the 2020 season, Jericho contacted Striar, asking to be a part of the league. Striar formally drafted Jericho into her faction during the first free-agent period following the season-opening draft. His first match is scheduled for August 27 against Kevin Smith.

 Cruises 

In 2017, Jericho launched Chris Jericho's Rock 'N' Wrestling Rager at Sea, a cruise "combining the worlds of rock and wrestling with a once in a lifetime amazing vacation experience". The cruise featured live band performances, artist-hosted activities and a Sea of Honor Tournament with over a dozen Ring of Honor wrestlers competing. Guests had the opportunity to get up close and personal with Chris and his closest wrestling, comedian, and musician friends including Jim Ross, Diamond Dallas Page and Jim Breuer, among others. The cruise sailed October 27–31, 2018, from Miami to Nassau, Bahamas.

Jericho hosted a second cruise, Chris Jericho's Rock 'N' Wrestling Rager at Sea Part Deux: Second Wave, which run from January 20–24, 2020. A third cruise, Chris Jericho's Rock 'N' Wrestling Rager at Sea Triple Whammy, is scheduled for October 21–25, 2021.

 Personal life 

Irvine married Jessica Lockhart on July 30, 2000. They reside in Odessa, Florida, with their three children: son Ash Edward Irvine (born 2003) and identical twin daughters Sierra Loretta "SiSi" Irvine and Cheyenne Lee "Chey" Irvine (born 2006). All three have been guests on his podcast, Talk Is Jericho, with his son discussing fish and his daughters discussing literature. Irvine owns three cats. In October 2020, Irvine reportedly donated $3,000 to Donald Trump's presidential re-election campaign.

Irvine is a Christian. He has a tattoo of his wife's name on his ring finger. He has the letter F, representing Fozzy, on the back of his hand. Since 2012, he has gradually gotten a sleeve over his left arm. His tattoos include: the artwork of Fozzy's album Sin and Bones, a Jack-o'-lantern (Avenged Sevenfold vocalist M. Shadows, who collaborated with Fozzy on the track "Sandpaper" from Sin and Bones, also got a matching tattoo), a lake monster, and himself from his WWF debut in 1999.

On July 5, 2004, Irvine was awarded Manitoba's The Order of the Buffalo Hunt, for his achievements in wrestling and his commitment to working with underprivileged children. – "After that, Gary Doer, the premier of Manitoba, awarded me with the Order of the Buffalo Hunt, which was the province's highest honor. It was quite the prestigious prize, which has been given to such dignitaries such as Mother Teresa, Desmond Tutu, Jimmy Carter, Pope John Paul II, and now Chris Jericho." / caption: "Manitoba Premier Gary Doer presents me with the Order of the Buffalo Hunt, along with a tiny bronze buffalo. I'm thinking, 'That's all I get?'"

Since January 2012, Irvine (along with former NFL Quarterback Tim Tebow, former NFL player Derrick Brooks, and former Atlanta Braves player Chipper Jones) has been the co-owner of a sports training facility in Tampa, a franchise site of D1 Sports Training and Therapy.

Irvine is a fan of Japanese convenience store chain Lawson, which Irvine would frequently shop at when he wrestled in Japan in the 1990s. Irvine still visits Lawson whenever he returns to Japan, whether to wrestle or if he is touring with Fozzy.

 Philanthropy 
Jericho keeps his philanthropic and charitable efforts private. Alongside WWE superstars Kevin Owens and Tyler Breeze, he donated $2,500 to help victims of the Alberta forest fires. He also donated $1,500 to help Brian Knobbs with his knee surgery. In 2023, after Buffalo Bills player Damar Hamlin's on-field collapse during a game against the Cincinnati Bengals, Jericho donated $10,000 to Hamlin's charity; originally a $5,000 donation, he later donated another $5,000 after misspelling his name in the original donation.

 Legal issues 
On February 7, 2009, a fan accused Irvine of punching her after she spat at him with fans outside Save-On-Foods Memorial Centre in Victoria, British Columbia, after a live event. Video footage, however, clearly showed he did not make contact with the woman. As a result of the incident, police detained them, but released them without charge. Police did not press charges against anyone in the brawl as it was "hard to determine who provoked whom."

On January 27, 2010, Irvine and fellow wrestler Gregory Helms were arrested in Fort Mitchell, Kentucky after leaving a bar. A police report stated that Helms punched Irvine and the other passengers in the cab. Fellow wrestlers Christian and CM Punk later bailed them out.

 Filmography 

 Video games 

{|class="wikitable sortable"
|- style="text-align:center;"
! colspan=4 style="background:#B0C4DE;" | WWE Video games
|- style="text-align:center;"
! style="background:#ccc;" | Year
! style="background:#ccc;" | Title
! style="background:#ccc;" | Notes
|-
| 1999
| WWF WrestleMania 2000
| Video game debut
|-
| rowspan="4"| 2000
| WWF SmackDown!
| 
|-
| WWF Royal Rumble
|
|-
| WWF No Mercy
|
|-
| WWF SmackDown! 2: Know Your Role
| Cover athlete
|-
| rowspan="4"| 2001
| With Authority!
|
|-
| WWF Betrayal
|
|-
| WWF Road to WrestleMania
|
|-
| WWF SmackDown! Just Bring It
|
|-
| rowspan="4"| 2002
| WWF Raw
|
|-
| WWE WrestleMania X8
|
|-
| WWE Road to WrestleMania X8
|
|-
| WWE SmackDown! Shut Your Mouth
| Cover athlete
|-
| rowspan="4"| 2003
| WWE Crush Hour
|
|-
| WWE WrestleMania XIX
|
|-
| WWE Raw 2
|
|-
| WWE SmackDown! Here Comes the Pain
|
|-
| rowspan="3"| 2004
| WWE Day of Reckoning
|
|-
| WWE Survivor Series
| Cover athlete
|-
| WWE SmackDown! vs. Raw
|
|-	
| rowspan="4"| 2005
| WWE WrestleMania 21
|
|-
| WWE Aftershock
|
|-
| WWE Day of Reckoning 2
|
|-
| WWE SmackDown! vs. Raw 2006
|
|-
| 2008
| WWE SmackDown vs. Raw 2009
|
|-
| 2009
| WWE SmackDown vs. Raw 2010
|
|-
| 2010
| WWE SmackDown vs. Raw 2011
|
|-
| 2011
| WWE All Stars
|
|-
| 2012
| WWE '13
|
|-
| 2013
| WWE 2K14
|
|-
| rowspan="2"| 2014
| WWE 2K15
| Motion capture
|-
| WWE SuperCard
|
|-
| 2015
| WWE 2K16
| Motion capture
|-
| 2016
| WWE 2K17
| Motion capture
|-
| rowspan="4"| 2017
| WWE Champions
|
|-
| WWE Tap Mania
|
|-
| WWE 2K18| Motion capture
|-
| WWE Mayhem|
|-
| 2018
| WWE 2K19| Motion capture
|}

 Championships and accomplishments 

 All Elite Wrestling
 AEW World Championship (1 time, inaugural)
AEW Dynamite Awards (2 times)
Bleacher Report PPV Moment of the Year (2021) – 
Biggest Beatdown (2021) – 
 The Baltimore Sun
 Feud of the Year (2008) 
 Canadian Rocky Mountain Wrestling
 CRMW North American Heavyweight Championship (1 time)
 CRMW North American Tag Team Championship (2 times) – with Lance Storm
CRMW Mid-Heavyweight Championship (2 times)
 Consejo Mundial de Lucha Libre
 NWA World Middleweight Championship (1 time)
 Extreme Championship Wrestling
 ECW World Television Championship (1 time)
 International Wrestling Alliance
 IWA Junior Heavyweight Championship (1 time)
 New Japan Pro-Wrestling
 IWGP Intercontinental Championship (1 time)
 Pro Wrestling Illustrated Faction of the Year (2021) – with The Inner Circle
Feud of the Decade (2000s) 
 Feud of the Year (2008) 
Feud of the Year (2021) 
 Most Hated Wrestler of the Year (2002, 2008)
 Ranked No. 2 of the top 500 singles wrestlers in the PWI 500 in 2009
Ring of Honor
 ROH World Championship (1 time)
 Rolling Stone Ranked No. 3 of the 10 best WWE wrestlers of 2016
 Sports Illustrated Ranked No. 5 of the top 10 male wrestlers in 2019
 World Championship Wrestling
 WCW Cruiserweight Championship (4 times)
 WCW World Television Championship (1 time)
 World Wrestling Federation/Entertainment/WWE
Undisputed WWF Championship (1 time)
 World Heavyweight Championship (3 times)
 WCW/World Championship (2 times)
 WWF/WWE Intercontinental Championship (9 times)
 WWE United States Championship (2 times)
 WWF European Championship (1 time)
 WWF Hardcore Championship (1 time)
 WWE Tag Team Championship (2 times) – with Edge (1) and Big Show (1)
 WWF/World Tag Team Championship (5 times) – with Chris Benoit (1), The Rock (1), Christian (1), Edge (1), and Big Show (1)
 Bragging Rights Trophy (2009) – with Team SmackDown 
WWF Undisputed Championship Tournament (2001)
 Fourth Grand Slam Champion
 Ninth Triple Crown Champion
 Slammy Award (3 times)
 Extreme Moment of the Year (2014) 
 Superstar of the Year (2008)
 Tag Team of the Year (2009) – with Big Show
 Wrestle Association "R"
 WAR International Junior Heavyweight Championship (1 time)
 WAR International Junior Heavyweight Tag Team Championship (1 time) – with Gedo
 World Wrestling Association
 WWA Tag Team Championship (1 time) – with El Dandy
 Wrestling Observer Newsletter''
Wrestler of the Year (2008, 2009, 2019)
 Best on Interviews (2003, 2008, 2009, 2019)
 Best on Interviews of the Decade (2000s)
 Feud of the Year (2008) 
 Pro Wrestling Match of the Year (2008) 
 Most Underrated Wrestler (1999, 2000)
 Readers' Favorite Wrestler (1999)
United States/Canada MVP (2019)
Most Charismatic (2019)
Best Box Office Draw (2019)
Best Pro Wrestling Book (2011) 
Wrestling Observer Newsletter Hall of Fame (Class of 2010)

Luchas de Apuestas record

Notes

References

Further reading

External links 

 
 
 
 
 
 
 
 
 
 
 

1970 births
Living people
21st-century American male actors
21st-century American singers
21st-century Canadian male actors
21st-century Canadian male singers
AEW World Champions
All Elite Wrestling personnel
American Christians
American color commentators
American game show hosts
American hard rock musicians
American heavy metal singers
American male film actors
American male professional wrestlers
American male singer-songwriters
American male television actors
American memoirists
American people of Scottish descent
American people of Ukrainian descent
American philanthropists
American podcasters
American radio personalities
American rock singers
American rock songwriters
American YouTubers
Canadian Christians
Canadian colour commentators
Canadian expatriate professional wrestlers in the United States
Canadian game show hosts
Canadian hard rock musicians
Canadian heavy metal singers
Canadian male film actors
Canadian male professional wrestlers
Canadian male singers
Canadian male singer-songwriters
Canadian male television actors
Canadian memoirists
Canadian people of Scottish descent
Canadian people of Ukrainian descent
Canadian philanthropists
Canadian podcasters
Canadian radio personalities
Canadian rock singers
Canadian YouTubers
Christians from New York (state)
ECW World Television Champions
Expatriate professional wrestlers in Japan
Expatriate professional wrestlers in Mexico
Fozzy members
IWGP Intercontinental champions
Jericho Appreciation Society members
Male actors from New York (state)
Male actors from Winnipeg
Musicians from Winnipeg
NWA/WCW World Television Champions
NWA/WCW/WWE United States Heavyweight Champions
Participants in American reality television series
People from Manhasset, New York
Professional wrestlers from Manitoba
Professional wrestlers from New York (state)
Professional wrestling podcasters
Red River College alumni
ROH World Champions
Singer-songwriters from New York (state)
Sportspeople from Winnipeg
WCW World Heavyweight Champions
World Heavyweight Champions (WWE)
WWE Champions
WWE Grand Slam champions
WWF European Champions
WWF/WWE Hardcore Champions
WWF/WWE Intercontinental Champions
20th-century professional wrestlers
21st-century professional wrestlers
WCW/WWE Cruiserweight Champions
NWA World Middleweight Champions
International Junior Heavyweight Tag Team Champions
Tenryu Project International Junior Heavyweight Champions